Medal for the General (US title: The Gay Intruders) is a 1944 British comedy film directed by Maurice Elvey. The screenplay by Elizabeth Baron is based on the novel of the same title by James Ronald (published in the U.S. under the title Old Soldiers Never Die).

Plot
The title character is General Victor Church, a proud World War I veteran who lives alone in a large house with his WW1 batman, Bates, and a few servants.  Church was highly decorated in WWI, including a Victoria Cross and the Distinguished Service Order.

At the onset of WW2 he goes to Whitehall to talk Major-General Lord Ottershaw (who was his adjutant in WW1) at the War Office to seek an active role in the War, after his numerous letters went unanswered.  Despite their mutual respect, Ottershaw tells Church that he is too old, his experience out of date and that there was no vacancy for him.  Church is subsequently ridiculed by some junior Army officers at his Club and although deflated, he decides to try and volunteer in the local Civil Defence organisations at the local town hall, but even they reject him.  A woman at the town hall (Irene Handl) tries to be nice to him but her patronising comments simply make him feel old and useless.  He becomes despondent and reclusive, cutting himself off from everyone and all news about the war. Eventually he takes to his bed and Bates becomes concerned about him. Bates arranges for an old friend of the General (Lady Frome) to visit along with the local doctor, but the General rejects all help and sends them away. As she leaves, Lady Frome tells Bates that she has an idea which may help.

The General then decides to go hunting for rabbits with his shotgun, but Bates becomes fearful that the General may attempt suicide with the shotgun and follows him. Whilst following, Bates observes the General pause and load the shotgun. Bates rushes in and disarms the General and encourages him to return home.  On their arrival back at the house they find that Lady Frome has returned and has arranged for six rambunctious Cockney children, evacuated from the London slums, to be billeted with him. Resistant at first, he gradually begins to enjoy his paternal role (he is a widower and his only son was killed in World War 1), despite the children's challenging behaviour.

The eldest boy (Harry) subsequently steals Church's medals and runs away.  The General uses logic to work out where he is and takes him back and begins buying books to help the boy train as a mechanic and lets him work on the engine of his Daimler with Bates.  One of the children (nicknamed ‘Limpy’ who is frightened at the sound of airplanes) is lame from an injury during a bombing raid and is examined by the local doctor after a fall. The doctor tells the General that the boy’s injury can be cured by surgery, but the boy is terrified. The General reveals his own leg injury, sustained during his wartime service, to Limpy who eventually agrees to the operation. The General pays his own private surgeon to do this.  The eldest girl, Carrie - who uses the name of "Snarrer" attempts to appear older than her years by smoking and wearing heavy makeup. She is eventually discouraged from this by Hank, an American soldier friend, with whom she falls in love. Hank is an honourable young man who promises to write and gives "Snarrer" a chaste kiss as he leaves for war, promising more when she is a little older.

One day a bomber crashes next to the mansion and the General becomes a local hero for rescuing the crew from the burning plane. He ends up in hospital with burnt hands. Limpy, having had his operation, is in the hospital bed next to him but the boy is too fearful to walk on his newly repaired leg. The General tricks Limpy into walking by feigning discomfort and presents Limpy with one of his own medals for his bravery.  McNab (the Scottish gardener) and Bates visit the General in hospital and tell him that he has been awarded the George Medal for his bravery as a civilian.

Cast
Godfrey Tearle as Gen. Victor Church
Jeanne de Casalis as Alice, Lady Frome (Victor's friend and local Women's Voluntary Services official)
Morland Graham as Bates (his batman)
Mabel Constanduros as  Mrs. Bates (the housekeeper)
John Laurie as McNab, the gardener
Patric Curwen as Dr. Sargeant  
Thorley Walters as Maj. Andrew Church (Victor's nephew and ADC to Lord Ottershaw)
Alec Faversham as Hank the soldier 
Michael Lambart as Maj-Gen. Lord Ottershaw (official at the War Office) 
Irene Handl as Mrs. Famsworth
Rosalyn Boulter as Billetting Officer
Maureen Glynne as Carrie Higgins - "Snarrer de la Fontaine" (eldest girl evacuee)
Gerald Moore as Harry Doakes (eldest boy evacuee)
Pat Geary as Violet Higgins (evacuee)
Petula Clark as Irma Smith (evacuee)
Brian Weske as Tommy Watkins - "Limpy" (evacuee)
David Trickett as Bobby Higgins (evacuee)

Production
Director Maurice Elvey was still searching for a young girl to portray the precocious orphan Irma when he attended a charity concert to benefit the National Fire Service at Royal Albert Hall. On the bill was 11-year-old Petula Clark, who in addition to singing appeared in a comedy sketch written by her father. Elvey was so impressed by her performance he went backstage and offered her the role in his film. The following year he cast her in I Know Where I'm Going!, and the two reunited for the 1954 film The Happiness of Three Women.

Critical reception
The Times said, "Medal for the General is hardly a subtle or intellectual film, but it is warmhearted and the acting and direction show tact and good sense throughout."

The Daily Telegraph thought the story "is hardly promising material, and the sentimental way in which it is treated does nothing to make it more palatable."

References

External links

Review of film at Variety

1944 films
1944 comedy films
British World War II films
British black-and-white films
Films directed by Maurice Elvey
British comedy films
Films scored by William Alwyn
Films set in London
Films shot at British National Studios
1940s English-language films
1940s British films